Islamic Front Bangladesh is an Islamist political party in Bangladesh.

History
Sayed Bahadur Shah Mujaddedi is the president of the party, and Abul Bashar Mohammad Zainul Abedin (Zubaer) its secretary.

In December 2006, the party aligned itself with the Awami League-led 'Grand Alliance'.

It claimed that Bangladesh Jamaat-e-Islami, the largest Islamist party in Bangladesh before its deregistration, was distorting the religion.

The party is associated with the student group Islami Chattrasena.

References

Islamic political parties in Bangladesh
Political parties in Bangladesh
Political parties with year of establishment missing
Far-right politics in Bangladesh